The 2022 Argentine Republic motorcycle Grand Prix (officially known as the Gran Premio Michelin de la República Argentina) was the third round of the 2022 Grand Prix motorcycle racing season. It was held at the Autódromo Termas de Río Hondo in Termas de Río Hondo on 3 April 2022.

In the MotoGP race, Aleix Espargaró won the race on his 200th MotoGP appearance after starting from pole position to take his and Aprilia's both maiden pole and victory in the premier class.

Background 
The race returned after the cancellation of the 2020 and 2021 editions as a response to the COVID-19 pandemic.

Logistical issues 
The race weekend program underwent a change due to logistical difficulties affecting freight transport. Five cargo flights were supposed to ship paddock material from Lombok, Indonesia, to Tucuman, near Termas de Rio Hondo in Argentina, in the week following the Indonesian GP. Due to two separate issues affecting two different flights, the final cargo for the Argentine GP arrived in the country on Friday. The trip from Lombok to Termas consisted of five flights. Three of the planned cargo routes carried cargo from Lombok to Tucuman via technical stops in Mombasa, Lagos and Brazil. The other two routes involved the transport of goods from Lombok to Doha, from Doha to Accra in Ghana and then to Tucuman. The difficulties began on Wednesday when one of the five planes encountered a problem during a technical stop in Mombasa, Kenya. The first plane that had already arrived in Tucuman was then brought back to Lombok to collect more cargo, but this too suffered a technical problem during a layover the previous Wednesday evening. On the morning of the Thursday before the weekend, local time in Argentina, a cargo remained ashore in Mombasa, Kenya. The plane waited for a part to fly back, with two parts - one shipped from Europe and another part in reserve, shipped from the Middle East - already en route. The plane took off Thursday evening and followed the route from Mombasa via Lagos and Brazil, arriving in Tucuman on Friday.

The Friday practice sessions were canceled. On Saturday morning there were two free practice sessions for all classes whose combined rankings counted as entrance to Q2. The MotoGP class initially had a third free practice session planned before qualifying, but was later canceled. Qualifying was held in the afternoon but with a postponement of the start times. Warm Up sessions on Sunday morning were extended, with each race set to begin at the same start time as originally scheduled.

Riders' entries 
In MotoGP class, Marc Márquez was absent in this Grand Prix due to the new diplopia episode which occurred due to the fall in the warm up during the Indonesian Grand Prix. Honda test rider Stefan Bradl took his place. Takaaki Nakagami was initially declared absent in this Grand Prix due to the positivity of the COVID-19 test and therefore unable to start. Following the postponement of the racing program and a new test to which he tested negative, he left for Argentina and was therefore available. In Moto2 class, Barry Baltus was out for the weekend with a broken right wrist remedied during qualifying for the Indonesian Grand Prix. The RW Racing GP team decided not to replace him. In Moto3 class, Taiyo Furusato recovered from his right ankle injury; the 2021 Asia Talent Cup champion thus made his debut in the class. As already happened in the first two stages, Gerard Riu replaced David Muñoz because the latter was still under the limit minimum age to run in the category. John McPhee does not race in this race (as in the Indonesian Grand Prix) after sustaining two fractured vertebrae during training. He was not replaced.

MotoGP Championship standings before the race 
After the Indonesian Grand Prix, Enea Bastianini kept the lead of the riders' standings with 30 points, two more than Brad Binder and three more than Fabio Quartararo. The 25 points gained by Miguel Oliveira following the victory of the previous race, allowed him to move up to fourth position, followed by only one point by Johann Zarco. In the constructors' classification, KTM overtook Ducati (45 points against 41). Yamaha was third with 27 points, followed by Suzuki at 20 points, one more than Honda and Aprilia. In the team championship standings, Red Bull KTM Factory Racing took the lead with 53 points, followed by Monster Energy Yamaha MotoGP and Team Suzuki Ecstar at 12 and 13 points respectively. Repsol Honda Team was fifth with 31 points, one more than Gresini Racing MotoGP.

Moto2 Championship standings before the race 
Celestino Vietti lead the riders' standings with 45 points, followed by Arón Canet and Sam Lowes with 36 and 29 points respectively. Somkiat Chantra, with his first career victory in Indonesia, climbed the ranking by 26 positions and was fourth with 25 points, one point more than Augusto Fernández. The constructors' classification saw the Kalex at 50 points, while Boscoscuro had 10 points. In the team championship standings, Flexbox HP40 and Elf Marc VDS Racing Team were tied on points with 48 points, three more than Idemitsu Honda Team Asia and Mooney VR46 Racing Team. Red Bull KTM Ajo is fifth with 35 points.

Moto3 Championship standings before the race 
The riders' classification saw Dennis Foggia, winner of the previous race, take the lead with 34 points, only one point ahead of Sergio García. Izan Guevara was third at 28 points, with Andrea Migno and Deniz Öncü following with 25 and points respectively. In the constructors' classification, Honda had full points with 50 points, with a 10-point advantage over Gas Gas. KTM and CFMoto were third (27 points) and fourth (22 points), while Husqvarna closed the ranking with 11 points. The ranking of the team championship had Gaviota GasGas Aspar Team as leader with 61 points; second was Leopard Racing with 40 points, 8 more than CFMoto Racing Prüstel GP, 14 from Red Bull KTM Tech3 and 15 from Rivacold Snipers Team.

Free practice

MotoGP 
In the first session, Takaaki Nakagami was the fastest, followed by Fabio Quartararo and Pol Espargaró. In the second session, Aleix Espargaró finished in the lead ahead of teammate Maverick Viñales and Jack Miller.

Combined Free Practice 1 and 2
The top ten riders (written in bold) qualified in Q2.

Qualifying

MotoGP

Moto2

Moto3

Race

MotoGP

Moto2

Moto3

Championship standings after the race
Below are the standings for the top five riders, constructors, and teams after the round.

MotoGP

Riders' Championship standings

Constructors' Championship standings

Teams' Championship standings

Moto2

Riders' Championship standings

Constructors' Championship standings

Teams' Championship standings

Moto3

Riders' Championship standings

Constructors' Championship standings

Teams' Championship standings

References

External links 

2022 MotoGP race reports
motorcycle Grand Prix
2022
April 2022 sports events in Argentina